The American Journal of Surgical Pathology is a peer-reviewed medical journal covering surgical pathology. It was established in 1977. Its first editor-in-chief was Stephen Sternberg (Memorial Sloan-Kettering Cancer Center); the current editor-in-chief is Stacey Mills (University of Virginia). According to the Journal Citation Reports, the journal has a 2018 impact factor of 6.155.

References

External links 
 

Publications established in 1977
English-language journals
Surgery journals
Lippincott Williams & Wilkins academic journals
Monthly journals